The 1938 Tulsa Golden Hurricane football team represented the University of Tulsa during the 1938 college football season. In their third year under head coach Vic Hurt, the Golden Hurricane compiled a 4–5–1 record (3–10 against conference opponents) and won the Missouri Valley Conference championship. The team defeated Oklahoma A&M (20–7), tied Arkansas (6–6) and lost to No. 10 Oklahoma (28–6) and TCU (21–0).

Schedule

After the season

The 1939 NFL Draft was held on December 9, 1938. The following Golden Hurricane player was selected.

References

Tulsa
Tulsa Golden Hurricane football seasons
Missouri Valley Conference football champion seasons
Tulsa Golden Hurricane football